Katie Thorlakson (born January 14, 1985, in New Westminster, British Columbia) is a Canadian retired soccer forward, who last played for Melbourne Victory FC. Thorlakson won two medals with the Canadian women's national soccer team at the Pan American Games in 2003 and 2007. She played collegiately soccer for the University of Notre Dame women's soccer team, where she record 73 assists, second most in school history. In 2004, she won the Soccer America Player of the Year Award, awarded to the best player in collegiate soccer for that year.

Playing career

Club career
Thorlakson was signed by Vancouver Whitecaps FC in 2003, but only played handful of games in next two seasons due to commitments to Notre Dame. She would later join the Whitecaps halfway through the 2005 season. In the summer of 2006, she tore her ACL, MCL and meniscus in her right knee.

International career
Thorlakson played in all six matches for the Canada under-19 team at the 2002 FIFA U-19 Women's World Championship, who lost in the final to the United States. At 19 years old, Thorlakson made her debut for the national team on July 30, 2004, against Japan. She scored her only two goals for Canada in an 11–1 win over Jamaica at the 2007 Pan American Games. Thorlakson was selected to the national team for the 2007 FIFA Women's World Cup, playing once in a 4–0 win over Ghana.

Honours

Club
Vancouver Whitecaps FC
 W-League (1): 2004

International
Canada
 CONCACAF Women's U-20 Championship (1): 2004
 Pan American Games: Silver (2003), Bronze (2007)

Individual
 Soccer America Player of the Year Award (1): 2004

References

External links
 
 
 Katie Thorlakson at Notre Dame Fighting Irish
 

1985 births
Living people
Canadian women's soccer players
Canada women's international soccer players
Women's association football forwards
Soccer people from British Columbia
University of Notre Dame alumni
Notre Dame Fighting Irish women's soccer players
People from New Westminster
Canadian expatriate sportspeople in the United States
Canadian expatriate women's soccer players
Footballers at the 2007 Pan American Games
Expatriate women's soccer players in the United States
Expatriate women's soccer players in Australia
Vancouver Whitecaps FC (women) players
USL W-League (1995–2015) players
Pan American Games silver medalists for Canada
Pan American Games bronze medalists for Canada
Pan American Games medalists in football
2007 FIFA Women's World Cup players
Medalists at the 2007 Pan American Games
Canadian expatriate sportspeople in Australia